Yunxi County is a county in the northwest of Hubei province, China, bordering Shaanxi province to the north and the west. It is under the administration of the prefecture-level city of Shiyan.

History 

During the Warring States period, the area belonged to the Chu State.

The area belonged to the  during the Qin Dynasty, which was later absorbed by the Han Dynasty.

Subsequently, Pingyang County was taken by the Jin Dynasty, and was renamed.

The subsequent Song, Yuan, Ming, and Qing dynasties all reorganized the region. It was in 1476 that an administrative division known as Yunxi County came into being.

Republic of China 
In 1932, the Republic of China introduced , and Yunxi County fell under the 11th Administrative Inspectorate of Hubei Province. In 1936, it was moved to the 8th Administrative Inspectorate of Hubei Province.

People's Republic of China 
On November 16, 1947, Yunxi County was taken by the People's Liberation Army, the first county in present-day Hubei that the army took.

The following year, it was renamed to Yunyang Prefecture, and moved to Hubei province. From 1952 to 1965, Yunyang Prefecture was abolished and merged into , but was restored after this. In 1994, the reorganized Yunyang Prefecture fell under the jurisdiction of the prefecture-level city of Shiyan, which administers Yunxi County to this day.

Geography 

The county's northwestern portion is relatively hilly, and borders the eastern section of the Qinling Mountains.

The Han River flows along the county's southern border, and a number of its tributaries flow through Yunxi County.

Climate

Administrative Divisions
Yunxi County administers nine towns, six townships, one ethnic township, and three other township-level divisions. These township-level divisions are then further divided into 348 village-level divisions.

Towns 

Townships 

Hubei Hui Ethnic Township 

Other township-level divisions 

Economy

Agriculture 
The county maintains a significant agricultural sector, with notable products from the region including grapes and goats.

Electricity 
As of 2020, the county is building a hydropower station, and has stated an intention to utilize the county's solar power and wind power potential.

Industry 
The Yunxi County Industrial Park spans an area of 2,200 mu. Major industries in the county include auto parts and agricultural equipment.

Tourism 
Yunxi County hosts four AAAA-level tourist attractions.

Transportation 
National Highway 209 runs through the county.

References

Counties of Hubei
 
Shiyan

no:Yunxi (Yueyang)